Susto is a cultural illness primarily among Latin American cultures.  It is described as a condition of "chronic somatic suffering stemming from emotional trauma or from witnessing traumatic experiences lived by others".

Symptoms

Among the indigenous peoples of Latin America, in which this illness is most common, susto may be conceptualized as a case of spirit attack. Symptoms of susto are thought to include nervousness, anorexia, insomnia, listlessness, fever, depression, and diarrhea.

Treatment
Treatments among indigenous people are natural. Some natural treatments to susto consist of using plants as medicine; sweating out the toxins; and massaging to encourage blood flow. Prayer is a big part of the treatment of susto. In addition to prayer, healing rituals are also used, some of which include sweeping and giving gifts.

Classification
Susto may be a culturally dependent variation of the symptoms of a panic attack, which is distinct from anxiety and depressive disorders.

See also
 Psychological trauma

References

Further reading
 Also published as Chapter 12 in 
Susto: The context of community morbidity patterns

Anthropology
Culture-bound syndromes
Latin American culture
Superstitions of the Americas